Lode Wyns (born 29 November 1946) is a Belgian athlete. He competed in the men's javelin throw at the 1968 Summer Olympics.

References

1946 births
Living people
Athletes (track and field) at the 1968 Summer Olympics
Belgian male javelin throwers
Olympic athletes of Belgium
Place of birth missing (living people)